Overlook, also known as the William Douglass Harlan House, is a historic home located near Martinsburg, Berkeley County, West Virginia. It was built in 1917 and is a two-story, stucco finished, wood frame Colonial Revival-style dwelling. It sits on a limestone foundation and has a slate-covered gable roof. It features a full-length porch across the front facade with a hipped roof supported by four Tuscan order columns.  Also on the property is a wood-frame garage (c. 1920), wood frame barn and corn crib (c. 1920), and a water pump (c. 1917).

It was listed on the National Register of Historic Places in 2004.

References

Colonial Revival architecture in West Virginia
Houses completed in 1917
Houses in Berkeley County, West Virginia
Houses on the National Register of Historic Places in West Virginia
Buildings and structures in Martinsburg, West Virginia
National Register of Historic Places in Berkeley County, West Virginia